Maidan Nezalezhnosti is a station on Kyiv Metro's Obolonsko–Teremkivska line. The station was opened on 17 December 1976, and is named after Kyiv's Maidan Nezalezhnosti (Independence Square) on the Khreschatyk street. It was designed by N. Kolomiiets, I. Maslenkov, M. Syrkyn, and F. Zaremba.

The station was formerly known as Ploscha Kalinina, but was renamed a year after its opening to Ploscha Zhovtnevoi revoliutsii. Maidan Nezalezhnosti forms a station complex with a transfer section with the neighbouring Khreschatyk station on the Sviatoshynsko-Brovarska Line.

The station is laid deep underground and consists of a central hall with porticoes. The lamps which light the station are hidden in the niches between the columns and the walls.

External links
 Kyivsky Metropoliten — Station description and photographs 
 Metropoliten.kiev.ua — Station description and photographs 

Kyiv Metro stations
Railway stations opened in 1976
Pecherskyi District
1976 establishments in Ukraine